The Tătârlaua is a left tributary of the river Balta in Romania. It discharges into the Balta near Cetatea de Baltă.

References

Rivers of Romania
Rivers of Sibiu County
Rivers of Alba County